Mein Schiff 5 is a cruise ship owned by TUI Cruises.

Mein Schiff 5 is mainly similar to Mein Schiff 3, Mein Schiff 4, and  Mein Schiff 6 with only minor differences to its sister vessels.

References 

Cruise ships
2016 ships
Ships built in Turku